Jaynagar Majilpur is a town and a municipality of the South 24 Parganas district in the Indian state of West Bengal. It is situated in the southern suburbs of Kolkata. As an urban setup in the vicinity of Kolkata, the town is within the area of Greater Kolkata. It is a part of the area covered by the Kolkata Metropolitan Development Authority (KMDA). Jaynagar and Majilpur are two separate towns. Since the formation of the municipality, these twin towns are known together as Jaynagar Majilpur. The town is very famous for its confectionery called Jaynagarer Moa.

Etymology
Jaynagar is an ancient settlement. The name of Jaynagar comes from the name of the local goddess Joychandi, from which the town derived the name, Joychanditala. Over time it became Joychandinagar and then Joynagar or Jaynagar.

Another ancient settlement is Majilpur. Originally the Ganges would flow over where the town is, but slowly it started silting down. This silting is called Moje Jaoa in Bengali language, from which the town derived the name, Mojapur. Over time it became Mojpur, Mojipur and then Mojilpur or Majilpur.

History
Many janapadas grew up along the old Bhagirathi channel from the ancient times until around the 16th century: Kalighat, Boral, Rajpur, Harinavi, Mahinagar, Baruipur, Baharu, Jaynagar, Majilpur, Chhatrabhog etc. Bipradas Pipilai's Manasavijaya, composed in 1495, mentions many places in this region. "Chand Sadagar, a merchant character of the Manasavijaya, reached Baruipur, from Kalighat, through the old Bhagirathi channel. From there he proceeded towards Chhatrabhog, and then traveling through Hatiagarh pargana reached the open sea". Chaitanyadeva (1486–1534) also went through this route. Travelling by boat to Puri he halted at the village of Atisara, near Baruipur. "His last stoppage in 24 Parganas was at Chhatrabhog, now a village within the jurisdiction of the Mathurapur police station. Chhatrabhog seems to have been an important river-port on the old Bhagirathi channel". Rama Chandra Khan, the zamindar of Chhatrabhog, helped Chaitanyadeva to continue with his journey.

The town of Jaynagar Majilpur carries the memory of a very significant incident in the history of the Bengal. When Pratapaditya, the last independent Hindu king of Bengal at Jessore was defeated by the Mughal forces, the State Diwan's (Grand vizier) family and the State Priest's family were forced to flee to avoid persecution and conversion. They settled down in the town to form the estate of the Duttas, and the Brahmin priest, Sree Krishna Udgata, who came over, settled down in what is today the Bhattacharya Para. All the Bhattacharyas in the town are his scions, with the current 13th generation being settled out of the town.

The town is famous for the ancient Dhanwantary Kali Temple, believed to be very benevolent, who listens to the prayers of her devotees promptly. An annual event is held, called the Besher Mela, where the goddess Kali is dressed up as Radha Krishna and other goddesses. It attracts thousands of devotees, and is one of the most iconic yearly events in the town. Also, by the express direction of the Dhanwantary Kali, every year, during Kali Puja, it is mandatory to host a Kali Puja in every Brahmin household of the town. It used to be a big annual festival, with hundreds of houses performing Kali Puja on the night of the Diwali, and going out on the next day in a beautifully orchestrated procession, going around the town, before the immersion or the Bisarjan. However, over the past few years, the number of houses performing Kali Puja has fallen drastically, now performed in only twenty odd houses. This has been mainly due to the gradual outward immigration of people from the hamlet, the reluctancy of the younger generation, and their inability to get hold of funds considering the deteriorating economic condition of Bengal, the rise of public subscription or locally called Barowari Puja and also the rise of Muslim immigrants and local population, who have posed problems while the peaceful immersion procession was on its way.

The town was also called Half-Calcutta owing to the development it had seen before independence, with stalwarts like Sivanath Sastri and Umesh Chandra Dutta emerging. It was also a centre for active freedom fighting, with names like Kanailal Bhattacharya and Rajaram Bhattacharya to name a few.

Geography

Area overview
Baruipur subdivision is a rural subdivision with moderate levels of urbanization. 31.05% of the population live in the urban areas and 68.95% live in the rural areas. In the southern portion of the subdivision (shown in the map alongside) there are 20 census towns. The entire district is situated in the Ganges Delta and the southern part is covered by the Baruipur-Jaynagar Plain. Archaeological excavations at Dhosa and Tilpi, on the bank of the Piyali River indicate the existence of human habitation around 2,000 years ago.

Note: The map alongside presents some of the notable locations in the subdivision. All places marked in the map are linked in the larger full screen map.

Location

Raynagar, Kalikapur Barasat, Baharu, Uttarparanij, Alipur and Uttar Durgapur, all in the Jaynagar I CD block, are adjacent to Jaynagar Majilpur. Nimpith and Tulshighata, both in the Jaynagar II CD block, are very close to Jaynagar Majilpur. These nine locations (eight census towns and a municipal city) virtually form a cluster.

Climate
Jaynagar Majilpur is subject to a tropical wet-and-dry climate that is designated Aw under the Köppen climate classification. According to a United Nations Development Programme report, its wind and cyclone zone is very high damage risk.

Temperature
Summers (March–June) are hot and humid, with temperatures in the low 30s Celsius; during dry spells, maximum temperatures often exceed  in May and June. The winter is mild and very comfortable weather pertains over the town throughout this season. Often, in April–June, the town is struck by heavy rains or dusty squalls that are followed by thunderstorms or hailstorms, bringing cooling relief from the prevailing humidity. These thunderstorms are convective in nature, and are known locally as Kal'bôishakhi, or Nor'westers in English.

Rainfall
Rains brought by the Bay of Bengal branch of the south-west summer monsoon lash Jaynagar Majilpur between June and September, supplying it with most of its annual rainfall of about 1,850 mm (73 in). The highest monthly rainfall total occurs in July and August. In these months often incessant rain for days brings live to a stall for the city dwellers. The town receives 2,528 hours of sunshine per year, with maximum sunlight exposure occurring in March. Jaynagar Majilpur has been hit by several cyclones; these include systems occurring in 1737 and 1864 that killed thousands.

Demographics

According to the 2011 Census of India, Jaynagar Majilpur had a total population of 25,922, of which 13,234 were males and 12,688 were females. There were 2,277 people in the age range of 0 to 6 years. The total number of literate people was 20,898, which constituted 80.6% of the population with male literacy of 83.8% and female literacy of 77.3%. The effective literacy (7+) of population over 6 years of age was 88.4%, of which male literacy rate was 92.0% and female literacy rate was 84.7%. The Scheduled Castes and Scheduled Tribes population was 4,830 and 24 respectively. Jaynagar Majilpur had a total of 6,036 households as of 2011.

According to the 2001 Census of India, Jaynagar Majilpur had a total population of 23,315. Males constitute 52% of the population and females 48%. It has an average literacy rate of 76%, higher than the national average of 59.5%: male literacy is 82%, and female literacy is 71%. 10% of the population is under 6 years of age.

Civic administration

Municipality
It has jurisdiction over parts of the Jaynagar Majilpur. It is divided into 14 wards. According to the 2022 municipal election, it is being controlled by the All India Trinamool Congress.

Police station
It has jurisdiction over parts of the Jaynagar Majilpur Municipality, and the Jaynagar I and Jaynagar II CD blocks.

CD block HQ
The headquarters of the Jaynagar I CD block are located at Baharu. The map of the CD block Jaynagar I on the page number 699 in the District Census Handbook 2011 for the South 24 Parganas district shows the headquarters of the CD block as being located in Jaynagar Majilpur.

The headquarters of the Jaynagar II CD block are located at Nimpith. The map of the CD block Jaynagar II on the page number 725 in the District Census Handbook 2011 for the South 24 Parganas district shows the headquarters of the CD block as being located in Jaynagar Majilpur.

Transport
Jaynagar Majilpur is on the State Highway 1.

Jaynagar Majilpur railway station is on the Sealdah–Namkhana line of the Kolkata Suburban Railway system.

Commuters
With the electrification of the railways, suburban traffic has grown tremendously since the 1960s. As of 2005–06, more than 1.7 million (17 lakhs) commuters use the Kolkata Suburban Railway system daily. After the partition of India, refugees from erstwhile East Pakistan and Bangladesh had a strong impact on the development of urban areas in the periphery of Kolkata. The new immigrants depended on Kolkata for their livelihood, thus increasing the number of commuters. Eastern Railway runs 1,272 EMU trains daily.

Education
 Dhruba Chand Halder College, established in 1965, is affiliated with the University of Calcutta. It offers honours courses in Bengali, English, Sanskrit, history, political science, philosophy, economics, geography, education, mathematics and accounting & finance, and general degree courses in arts, science, and commerce.
 Jaynagar Institution is a Bengali-medium school for boys. It was established in 1878 and has facilities for teaching from class V to class XII.
 Jaynagar P. C. Paul Institution is a Bengali-medium school for boys. It was established in 1915 and has facilities for teaching from class V to class XII.
 Jaynagar Institution for Girls, a Bengali-medium school for girls.
 Jaynagar Chamatkarini Balika Vidyalaya is a Bengali-medium school for girls. It was established in 1941 and has facilities for teaching from class V to class XII.
 Majilpur J. M. Training School is a Bengali-medium school for boys. It was established in 1905 and has facilities for teaching from class V to class XII.
 Majilpur Shyamsundar Balika Vidyalaya is a Bengali-medium school for girls. It was established in 1934 and has facilities for teaching from class V to class XII.
 Majilpur Atul Krishna Vinodini Bhattacharya Vidyapith is a Bengali-medium school for boys. It was established in 1948 and has facilities for teaching from class V to class XII.

Healthcare
Jaynagar Majilpur Maternity Home, with 10 beds, is the major government medical facility in the Jaynagar Majilpur.

Places of interest

Nimpith
Nimpith is a beautiful place within the jurisdiction of the Jaynagar police station in the Jaynagar II CD block. Famous Nimpith Sri Ramkrishna Ashrama is a Non-Governmental Organization, started by Swami Buddhanandaji in 1960. Inspired with the clarion call of the Wondering Monk, Swami Vivekananda, Swami Buddhanandaji Maharaj, an altruist monk of the Ramakrishna Order founded Sri Ramkrishna Ashram in 1960 at Nimpith with avowed mission to serve the distressed, the deserted and the destitutes as adorable Shiva in obscurity of the Sundarbans. The Ashram had virtually waged a ceaseless war against poverty, hunger, ignorance and social injustice, though scanty were its resources. 
To work for the downtrodden people of Nimpith and surrounding villages, Swami Buddhananda started the Ramakrishna Ashram Krishi Vigyan Kendra, through the help of Indian Council of Agricultural Research (ICAR), New Delhi, in the year 1979.

Temples of Joynagar Majilpur
There are many old famous temples in Joynagar Majilpur. One of the temple of goddess Joychandi is present almost center of Joynagar side. Few steps away from Joychandi temple one can witness the Dwadosh Shiv Mandir (12 temples) founded by the Mitras. Another old temple of Joynagar is Radha-Ballav Jiu Temple. It was said that this was one of the oldest among the temples of Joynagar. A further away from this temple is the temple of Radha-Shyamsundar Jiu. There are a number of temples at Joynagar side in Joynagar Majilpur town. In Majilpur side there are also many old temples.  Sambiteswar shiv temple is one of the oldest temples in town. Another one is Gopal’s temple at Majilpur Dutta Para. It can be reached both by rail and road. But the best option is rail route. Take any Namkhana/Lakshmikantapur bound train from Sealdah and get down at Joynagar-Majilpur station. Toto or auto is the best option to explore the town.

Notable people
 Sivanath Sastri
 Kanailal Bhattacharjee
 Nilratan Sircar
 Jogindranath Sarkar
 Shakti Chattopadhyay
 Bimal Krishna Matilal
 Hemant Kumar
 Nirmala Mishra
 Subodh Banerjee
 Paresh Nath Kayal
 Sakti Kumar Sarkar
 Sanat Kumar Mandal
 Tarun Mandal
 Pratima Mondal
 Biswanath Das

References

External links
 
 
 

 
Cities and towns in South 24 Parganas district
Neighbourhoods in Kolkata
Kolkata Metropolitan Area